Eduardo Moreira Dischinger (born 18 May 1992) is a Brazilian tennis player.

Dischinger has a career high ATP singles ranking of 540 achieved on 29 April 2013. He also has a career high ATP doubles ranking of 248 achieved on 31 August 2015. He has won 7 ITF doubles titles.

Dischinger won his first ATP Challenger title at the 2015 Sport 1 Open in the doubles event partnering Ariel Behar.

External links
 
 

Brazilian male tennis players
1992 births
Living people
Sportspeople from Porto Alegre